The drab-breasted bamboo tyrant (Hemitriccus diops) is a species of bird in the family Tyrannidae. It is found in Argentina, Brazil, and Paraguay. Its natural habitats are subtropical or tropical moist lowland forest and subtropical or tropical moist montane forest.

References

drab-breasted bamboo tyrant
Birds of the Atlantic Forest
drab-breasted bamboo tyrant
Taxonomy articles created by Polbot